Kirklington-cum-Upsland is a civil parish in the Hambleton district of North Yorkshire, England. The main settlement is Kirklington.  Upsland is a single farm in the south-west of the parish.

Kirklington cum Upsland was historically a township in the ancient parish of Kirklington in the North Riding of Yorkshire.  It became a separate civil parish in 1866. From 1894 it formed an urban district, but in 1934 the urban district was abolished and merged with Bedale Rural District.  In 1974 the parish was transferred to Hambleton district in the new county of North Yorkshire.  Since 1978 it has shared a grouped parish council, Kirklington with Sutton Howgrave, with the parishes of Howgrave and Sutton with Howgrave.

References 

Civil parishes in North Yorkshire
Hambleton District